Beauty and the Bandit is a 1946 American Western film directed by William Nigh and written by Charles S. Belden. The film stars Gilbert Roland, Martin Garralaga, Frank Yaconelli, Ramsay Ames, Vida Aldana and George J. Lewis. The film was released on November 9, 1946, by Monogram Pictures.

Plot

Set in the late 1800s of California, The Cisco Kid returns to the screen. The bandito, disguised with his men as an escort, ambushes a stagecoach which carries a wealthy young Frenchman named Du Bois. Du Bois is delivering a chest of silver to San Marino, and the Cisco Kid claims it is money that was stolen over many years from the impoverished people of California, and he intends to return it. The Kid's gang escape with the money, but the Cisco Kid stays behind, only to learn that Du Bois is actually a beautiful young woman, Jeanne Du Bois. Du Bois agrees to accompany the Kid back to his hideout, and the two find themselves attracted to one another even though they are on opposite sides. The bandit eventually offers to return the money to Du Bois, and she must then decide how to distribute that money.

Cast           
Gilbert Roland as The Cisco Kid
Martin Garralaga as Dr. Juan Valegra
Frank Yaconelli as Baby
Ramsay Ames as Jeanne Du Bois
Vida Aldana as Waitress Rosita
George J. Lewis as Capitan
William Gould as Doc Wells
Dimas Sotello as Farmer
Felipe Turich as Sick Farmer
Glen Strange as Cisco’s friend

References

External links
 
 

1946 films
1940s English-language films
American Western (genre) films
1946 Western (genre) films
Monogram Pictures films
Films directed by William Nigh
American black-and-white films
1940s American films